Mario Astaburuaga (4 July 1904 – 1951) was a Chilean swimmer. He competed in the men's 100 metre freestyle event at the 1928 Summer Olympics.

References

External links

1904 births
1951 deaths
Chilean male freestyle swimmers
Olympic swimmers of Chile
Swimmers at the 1928 Summer Olympics